The Twelve Mile 500 is a lawn mower race held in the small town of Twelve Mile, Indiana, organized by the Twelve Mile Lions Club and occurring annually on Independence Day.  The tradition began in 1963 as a race for factory-built mowers with their mowing decks removed but in 1996 split into a two-race event with one for four-cycle Briggs lawn mowers and another for modified mowers.  The race adopted the "Grand Prix" style in 1970 and has been held in Plank Hill Park ever since. The race structure has once again changed with the addition of another race. The 2010 race will include a superstock race in addition to the Briggs and modified races.

The Twelve Mile 500 is 15 mile race, with 60 laps run on a quarter-mile track in the park, with a maximum of 33 entrants per race.  Each participating team consists of a driver, a two-person pit crew and a lap judge, and must meet a speed of approximately 30 mph to qualify.

References
Pharos-Tribune: "Drivers revving up for Twelve Mile 500"
Pharos-Tribune: "Troyers dominate Twelve Mile 500"

Tourist attractions in Cass County, Indiana
Tool racing